The Bahrain women's national futsal team represents Bahrain in international women's futsal competitions and is controlled by the Bahrain Football Association.

Results and fixtures 

Legend

2012

2018

2019

2022

Coaching staff

Current coaching staff

Current squad
The following players were called up for the 2022 WAFF Women's Futsal Championship from 16–22 June 2022.

Competitive record

AFC Women's Futsal Asian Cup

*Draws include knockout matches decided on penalty kicks.

Futsal at the Asian Indoor and Martial Arts Games

*Draws include knockout matches decided on penalty kicks.

WAFF Women's Futsal Championship

*Draws include knockout matches decided on penalty kicks.

References

Bahrain women's national football team
Women's football in Bahrain
Asian women's national futsal teams